During the 1938–39 English football season, Brentford competed in the Football League First Division. A six-match unbeaten run in February and March 1939 pulled the club clear of a near-certain relegation.

Season summary
After successive top-six finishes in Brentford's first three seasons in the First Division and with the club making a record £7,348 profit on the previous season (equivalent to £ in ), manager Harry Curtis again elected to not make any significant off-season signings, stating "negotiations took place in an effort to get certain players of great repute, but the deals did not come off. During this close season the position still seems to be the same, the clubs being unwilling to part with players, irrespective of the price offered". Enquiries for Manchester City's Peter Doherty, Blackpool's Danny Blair, Everton's Joe Mercer, Hull City's David Parker and Scots Jimmy Carabine and Andy Black were all rebuffed.

Long-serving Scottish international wing half Duncan McKenzie was sold to Middlesbrough in May 1938 for a £6,000 fee. After youngsters Les Smith and Gerry McAloon were promoted into the first team during the previous two seasons, Curtis would again dip into the reserve and junior ranks and give debuts to left back Doug Anderson and forwards Len Townsend and George Wilkins during the season. Brentford finished pre-season with a 2–1 Football League Jubilee Fund victory over neighbours Chelsea.

Brentford started the First Division season with two wins and a draw – the second victory being played in front of a club record 38,535 home crowd versus London rivals Arsenal. Just one point from the following seven matches dropped the Bees to the bottom of the First Division. Scottish international forward David McCulloch's previous prolific goalscoring form had deserted him and reliable forwards Bobby Reid and Billy Scott also found goalscoring chances hard to come by. Having scored just twice in 9 appearances, McCulloch departed Griffin Park to join Derby County for a £9,500 fee on 22 October 1938. Brentford's form picked up slightly after McCulloch's departure, losing just three of the following 12 matches, but two other regular starters departed in the midst of the run – forward George Eastham to Blackpool for £5,000 and long-serving captain Arthur Bateman was forced to retire. Manager Curtis signed Irish international full back Bill Gorman to partner George Poyser in defence and promoted young forwards Len Townsend and George Wilkins to the first team. In December 1938, he added former Fulham reserve team manager Joe Edelston to the coaching staff.

Brentford's bad form continued through to February 1939 and again the team was hit by the loss of a key players, with Scottish international forward Bobby Reid moving to Sheffield United and Gerry McAloon departing for Wolverhampton Wanderers the following month. Manager Curtis brought in two new forwards, Tommy Cheetham from local rivals Queens Park Rangers and Les Boulter from Charlton Athletic for £5,000 each. Cheetham scored on his second appearance to begin a run of five wins and a draw, which took the Bees up to 13th position and effectively saved the club's top-flight status. Brentford lost seven of the remaining 10 matches and finished in 18th place.

Despite the poor finish, the season ended on a high note, when on 24 May 1939, 21-year-old forward Les Smith became the second Brentford player to win a full England cap, which came in a 2–0 friendly win over Romania in Bucharest.

League table

Results
Brentford's goal tally listed first.

Legend

Football League First Division

FA Cup

 Sources: Statto, 11v11, 100 Years of Brentford

Playing squad 
Players' ages are as of the opening day of the 1938–39 season.

 Sources: 100 Years of Brentford, Timeless Bees, Football League Players' Records 1888 to 1939

Coaching staff

Statistics

Appearances and goals

Players listed in italics left the club mid-season.
Source: 100 Years of Brentford

Goalscorers 

Players listed in italics left the club mid-season.
Source: 100 Years of Brentford

International caps

Full

Amateur

Management

Summary

Transfers & loans 
Cricketers are not included in this list.

References 

Brentford F.C. seasons
Brentford